Nikola Karczewska (born 16 October 1999) is a Polish footballer who plays as a forward for Women Super League club Tottenham Hotspur and the Poland women's national team.

Club career

UKS SMS Łódź 
Karczewska begun her career with Polish second division side UKS SMS Łódź. At the end of the 2016-17 season, she helped the club to gain promotion to the Polish top flight Ekstraliga.

Górnik Łęczna 
In 2019, Karczewska signed with Ekstraliga side Gornik Leczna. During her first season with the club, she helped the club to achieve a league and cup double by winning both the Ekstraliga and Polish Women's Cup as well as achieving qualification to the UEFA Women’s Champions League.

FC Fleury 91 
In June 2021, Karczewska signed with Division 1 Féminine side FC Fleury 91. She scored her first goal for the club in a 1-0 win over ASJ Soyaux-Charente on 25 September 2021. She scored her first hat-trick for the club in a 4-2 league win over AS Saint-Étienne. In her lone season with the club, she made 24 appearances and netted 10 goals for the club. She ended the season as the club's top scorer and help them to their highest league position to date by finishing 4th in the league.

Tottenham Hotspur 
In July 2022, Karczewska signed with Women Super League side Tottenham Hotspur. On 24 September 2022, she made her club debut in a 4-0 loss against Arsenal in a league match. She scored her first goal for the club in a FA WSL Cup win against Reading on 2 October 2022.

International Career 
Karczewska has represented Poland in their U19 women's national team before making her first appearance for the Polish women's national team in a 1-0 loss to Slovakia on 14 June 2019. She scored her first goal for her country on 7 April 2022 against Armenia. She went on to score a total of 6 goals in the same match.

Career Statistics

Club

International

International goals 
Scores and results list Poland's goal tally first, score column indicates score after each Karczewska goal.

Honours 
Gornik Leczna
 Ekstraliga: 2019-20
 Polish Women's Cup: 2019-20

References

1999 births
Living people
Women's association football forwards
Polish women's footballers
Poland women's international footballers
UKS SMS Łódź players
Górnik Łęczna (women) players

External Links 

 
 Tottenham Hotspur profile